3,10-Dihydroxydecanoic acid is a chemical found in royal jelly.

See also
3,11-Dihydroxydodecanoic acid

References

Fatty acids
Diols
Bee products
Beta hydroxy acids